Pietro Farina (born 5 February 1955) is an Italian sprinter. He competed in the men's 200 metres at the 1976 Summer Olympics.

References

External links
 

1955 births
Living people
Athletes (track and field) at the 1976 Summer Olympics
Italian male sprinters
Olympic athletes of Italy
Universiade medalists in athletics (track and field)
Place of birth missing (living people)
Universiade silver medalists for Italy
Medalists at the 1977 Summer Universiade